Gerd Gies (born 24 May 1943 in Stendal, Germany) is a German politician (CDU). He was the 1st Minister President of Saxony-Anhalt after its creation following the reunification of Germany.  Gies held office from October 1990 to 4 July 1991, when he was forced to resign after he was accused of having collaborated with the Stasi. He was succeeded by Werner Münch.  Gies remained a parliamentary delegate until 1998.  Afterwards, he worked in the energy industry and served on the board of Electrabel Germany.

External links
Dr. Gerd Gies at the Bundesverband Neuer Energieanbieter

1943 births
Living people
People from Stendal
Christian Democratic Union (East Germany) politicians
Christian Democratic Union of Germany politicians
Members of the Landtag of Saxony-Anhalt
Christian Peace Conference members
Ministers-President of Saxony-Anhalt